Ganseogogeori Station is a subway station on Line 1 of the Incheon Subway located at 239-3 Ganseok-dong, Jiha642, Gyeonginno, Namdong-gu, Incheon South Korea.

Station layout

Exits

References

Metro stations in Incheon
Seoul Metropolitan Subway stations
Railway stations in South Korea opened in 1999
Namdong District